Varacin is a bicyclic organosulfur compound originally found in marine Ascidiacea from the Polycitor genus. It contains an unusual pentathiepin ring which reacts with DNA, and varacin and synthetic analogues have been investigated for their antimicrobial and antitumour properties. Because of its potent biological activity and unusual and challenging ring system, it has been a popular target of efforts toward its total synthesis.

References 

Phenethylamines
Sulfur heterocycles
Phenol ethers
Heterocyclic compounds with 2 rings